EOK may refer to:

 Aero K, ICAO airline code
 Entrepreneurs of Knoxville, an American fraternal service organization
 Estonian Olympic Committee 
 Hellenic Basketball Federation, the governing body for basketball in Greece
 Keokuk Municipal Airport, in Iowa
 National Organization of Crete, a World War II era resistance organization